{{Infobox person
| name = Mikheil Chiaureli
| honorific_suffix = 
| image = Chiaureli ME.jpg
| imagesize = 
| birthname = 
| birth_date = 
| birth_place = Tiflis, Russian Empire(now Georgia)
| death_date = 
| death_place = Tbilisi, Georgian SSR, Soviet Union(now Georgia)
| resting_place = Mtatsminda Pantheon, Tbilisi
| othername = 
| occupation = Film director, Screenwriter
| yearsactive = 
| notable_works = The Fall of Berlin 
| title = People's Artist of the USSR 
| spouse = Veriko Anjaparidze
| children = Sofiko Chiaureli
| awards = Stalin Prize 
}}

Mikheil Chiaureli (6 February 1894 – 31 October 1974) was a Soviet Georgian actor, film director and screenwriter. He directed 25 films between 1928 and 1974. He was awarded the Stalin Prize five times in 1941, 1943, 1946, 1947, and 1950.

Biography
In early life Chiaureli studied in a trade school and then worked for a while as a locksmith. Starting in amateur dramatics he became a professional actor aged 20 and worked as both actor and stage-decorator at the Tbilisi theatre. After 1917 he studied acting formally at the Tbilisi Academy of Arts.

Chiaureli won four Stalin Prizes and became a Deputy of the Supreme Soviet of the USSR.

Selected filmography
as actor
 Arsen Dzhordjiashvili (1921) as star of the first Soviet film made in Georgia
 The Suram Fortress (1922)
 Iron Hard Labor (1924)
as directorThe First Cornet Streshnev (1928)Saba (1929)Khabarda (1931)The Last Masquerade (1934)Arsen (1937)The Great Dawn (1938)Georgi Saakadze (1942)Klyatva (The Vow) (1946)The Fall of Berlin (1949)The Unforgettable Year 1919 (1952)The Widow Otarova (1957)The Story of a Girl (1960)Generals and Daisies (1964)Any Other Time'' (1967)

References

External links

Soviet film directors
Academic staff of the Gerasimov Institute of Cinematography
Stalin Prize winners
Film directors from Georgia (country)
Film people from Tbilisi
1894 births
1974 deaths